Emma Louise Powell is a South African politician who has been a Member of Parliament (MP) for the Democratic Alliance (DA)

She was named as the Shadow Deputy Minister of Human Settlements, Water and Sanitation in the Shadow Cabinet of Mmusi Maimane in June 2019.

In December 2020, she was appointed as Shadow Minister of Human Settlements by John Steenhuisen.

References

External links 
 National Assembly biography
 Emma Powell on Twitter
 Emma Powell on LinkedIn

Living people
University of Cape Town alumni
University of KwaZulu-Natal alumni
Democratic Alliance (South Africa) politicians
Members of the National Assembly of South Africa
Year of birth missing (living people)
Women members of the National Assembly of South Africa